Vědomice is a municipality and village in Litoměřice District in the Ústí nad Labem Region of the Czech Republic. It has about 900 inhabitants.

Geography

It lies in the Lower Eger Table. It is situated in a meander of the Elbe River.

References

Villages in Litoměřice District